Michael Doyle (born September 16, 1972) is an American actor. He is mainly known for his role on Law & Order: Special Victims Unit as Ryan O'Halloran  and since 2018 on New Amsterdam as Martin McIntyre.

Early life and career
Doyle attended the Juilliard School as a member of the Drama Division's Group 27 (1994-1998).

On the set of Oz Doyle met George Morfogen, whom he would cast in Shiner, a short film written, produced and directed by Doyle that debuted at the 2006 Tribeca Film Festival. Doyle also wrote and produced the 2003 limited-release film Cutter.  Doyle also appeared as Jamie Perse, a small-time crook, in the 1996 television miniseries Titanic (also starring Peter Gallagher and Catherine Zeta-Jones).

Doyle played Lt. Cmdr. Tom Palatonio in the 2005 action film Phantom Below. His death in the season 10 finale of Law & Order: Special Victims Unit ended a successful six-year run as forensic tech Ryan O'Halloran on the show. He guest starred on episodes of Criminal Minds and In Plain Sight.

He appeared alongside Nicole Kidman and Aaron Eckhart in 2010's Rabbit Hole. In 2011, the feature film Union Square, co-written and directed by Sundance Film Festival's Grand Jury Award Winner Nancy Savoca, was premiered at the Toronto International Film Festival, which starred Mira Sorvino, Patti Lupone, Michael Rispoli and Tammy Blanchard. He also starred in The Orphan Killer as Marcus Miller Sr. in 2011. He then joined the cast of A Gifted Man as Victor Lantz, an anesthesiologist. He had a recurring role in the 2012 ABC television series 666 Park Avenue.

In 2014, he portrayed songwriter and record producer Bob Crewe in the film of the hit musical Jersey Boys, based on the story of Frankie Valli & the Four Seasons. He also appeared in the music video "I Wanna Get Better" by Jack Antonoff's band Bleachers, alongside Retta. In 2016 Doyle starred as Greg Forrest in the psychological thriller, Amy Makes Three.

Personal life
Doyle is gay. He directed 2019 independent film Almost Love with openly gay actors in the leading roles.

Filmography

References

External links

American male film actors
American male stage actors
American male television actors
20th-century American male actors
21st-century American male actors
Juilliard School alumni
Living people
Place of birth missing (living people)
1972 births
American gay actors